Johan Henrik Deuntzer (20 May 1845 – 16 November 1918) was a Danish professor and politician who served as a member of the Liberal Venstre party  until 1905 where he joined the Danish Social Liberal Party. He was Council President and Foreign Minister of Denmark from 1901 to 1905 as the leader of the Cabinet of Deuntzer.

Biography
Deuntzer was born in Copenhagen as the son of architect  Johan Jacob Deuntzer (1808–1875) and Sophie Margrethe Kornbech (1815-1892). He graduated  cand. Jur. from the University of Copenhagen in 1867. In 1871 he made a study trip to Vienna, Paris and London. He was professor in the department of civil law  from 1872 to 1901. In 1894 he received an honorary doctor at the University of Copenhagen.  Deuntzer was a parliamentarian from 1901 to 1913. From 1914 to 1918 he was one of the king's appointed members of the Landsting.

References

1845 births
1918 deaths
Politicians from Copenhagen
University of Copenhagen alumni
Danish jurists
Danish educators
Prime Ministers of Denmark
Foreign ministers of Denmark
Members of the Folketing
Members of the Landsting (Denmark)
19th-century Danish politicians
20th-century Danish politicians